Nind is an unincorporated community in Adair County, in the U.S. state of Missouri.

History
A post office called Nind was established in 1887, and remained in operation until 1907. The origin of the name Nind is obscure.

References

Unincorporated communities in Adair County, Missouri
1887 establishments in Missouri
Unincorporated communities in Missouri